Joba Murmu is an Indian writer and litterateur who is known for her works in Santali literature. She received the Sahitya Akademi's Children's Literature Award on November 14, 2017 due to her language contribution to Santali literature.

Life introduction 
Joba Murmu is a Santhali writer and a very known face in Santhali community. She is a winner of Bal Sahitya Puraskar by Sahitya Akademi, New Delhi for the year 2017. 
Born in Jamshedpur, Jharkhand to Shri C R Majhi and Late Baha Murmu. She was always a keen reader of novels and stories in her early childhood, which led her to write one of herself. She followed her father's footsteps who is also an  author of many santhali books and his articles in local newspaper are a part of daily life. 

While in college her interest rose in dramatics where she met her better half Mr. Pitambar Majhi, who is  also a Sahitya Akademi Bal Shaitya Puraskar winner in 2012. After completing her graduation, she did her post graduation in Santhali and Hindi. She is also a law graduate . Her writing career started with a poem which was first published in the college magazine since then she never looked back.  She have several  books under her name like BAHA UMUL a poetry collection ,BEWRA (Short stories), PREM CHANDAH SORES KAHANI KO (Translation) and others. OLON BAHA for which she received the Sahitya Akademi award in 2017  is a collection of short stories . She is also one of the few who have successfully translated the famous Geetanjali by Rabindra Nath Tagore in Santhali. SERENG ANJLE is the name of the translated book published by Sahitya Akademi, New Delhi. For which she was awarded R R KISKU RAPAJ TRANSLATION AWARD in 2016  from All India Santhali Writers Association. She has many other awards in her bag like Pt. Raghunath Murmu award in 2012 & Rabindranath Tagore award in 2020. 

She is currently working as a teacher under Government of Jharkhand. In her long career she has also been lyricist, script writer and director in a Santhali film. She has got opportunity to sing many folk songs in All India Radio, Jamshedpur. 

Recently, she has been approached by NCERT, New Delhi for developing an anthology in Hindi  for use of teaching in higher secondary. Her poems are also a part of International Multilingual Poetry Anthology, 2018 & 2019. She has been attending various international poet meets which only gives her  confidence and encourage her to write more. Amravati poetic prism, Vijaywada and World thinkers and Writers meet, Kolkata are few of them."/>

Writing assignment
She has written many stories in Santhali. Her book of short stories 'Olon Baha' was given the Sahitya Academy's Bal Sahitya Puraskar,2017.

She translated the stories of Premchand and Gitanjali of Rabindranath Thakur in Santhali.

See also
 Indian Academy of Literature 
 Santali literature

References 

Year of birth missing (living people)
Living people